The Four Days of Naples is a 1962 Italian film, directed by Nanni Loy and set during the uprising which gives its name. It stars Regina Bianchi, Aldo Giuffrè, Lea Massari, Jean Sorel, Franco Sportelli, Charles Belmont, Gian Maria Volonté and Frank Wolff.

The film won the Nastro d'Argento for Best Director, and was nominated for an Academy Award for Best Foreign Language Film and Writing Original Screenplay, and a BAFTA Award for Best Film. At the 3rd Moscow International Film Festival in 1963, the film was awarded with the FIPRESCI Prize.

Plot 
Following the truce between Italy and the Allies in World War II, German forces occupy Naples and begin to shoot resisters, demolish port facilities and round up young men to be transported to Germany as forced labour. The city's population, aware that Allied forces are close and determined to disrupt the deportations, revolt against the Germans, despite their limited arms and organization. After four days, Germans forces retreat from the city just before Allied troops arrive by advancing from the Salerno beachhead.

Cast
 Regina Bianchi as Concetta Capuozzo (as Régina Bianchi)
 Aldo Giuffrè as Pitrella
 Lea Massari as Maria
 Jean Sorel as sailor livornese
 Franco Sportelli as Prof. Rosati
 Charles Belmont as Sailor
 Gian Maria Volonté as captain Royal Italian Army
 Frank Wolff as Salvatore
 Luigi De Filippo as Cicillo
 Pupella Maggio as Arturo's Mother
 Georges Wilson as Reformatory Director
 Raffaele Barbato as Ajello
 Rosalia Maggio as concerned woman
 Enzo Cannavale as partisan
  as 
 Raffaele Barbato as Ajello

See also
 List of submissions to the 35th Academy Awards for Best Foreign Language Film
 List of Italian submissions for the Academy Award for Best Foreign Language Film

References

External links 
 
 
 

1962 films
1962 war films
Italian war films
1960s Italian-language films
Films about Italian resistance movement
Films set in Naples
Italian Campaign of World War II films
Films directed by Nanni Loy
Films scored by Carlo Rustichelli
Titanus films
Italian World War II films
1960s Italian films